Yong Soon Min (born 29 April 1953) is a Korean-born American artist, curator, and educator. She serves as professor emeritus at University of California, Irvine. Her artwork deals with issues including Korean-American identity, politics, personal narrative, and culture. Min has been active in New York City and Los Angeles.

Biography 
Yong Soon Min was born on 29 April 1953 in Bugok, South Korea. Her family immigrated to the United States in 1960, settling in Monterey, California. Min met her father for the first time around age 8, because he had moved to the United States earlier than the rest of the family.

She attended the University of California, Berkeley (U.C. Berkeley), where she received her B.A. degree (1975), M.A. degree (1977), and M.F.A. degree (1979). One of her classmates at U.C. Berkeley was artist Theresa Hak Kyung Cha. In 1981, Min was part of the Independent Study Program at the Whitney Museum of American Art.

Min was married to artist Allan deSouza in 1992, whom she often collaborated with on artwork.

In 2001, she was awarded the Anonymous Was A Woman Award. Other awards include the Fulbright Fellowship (2010–2011), Rockefeller Foundation Grant (2003), and the National Studio Program at P.S.1 (1991).

Work 
Her early work was primarily graphic or photography based; and by the mid-1980s she started to work more in installation art.

Min's installation work deColonization (1991) was centered around a traditional Korean dress in white with gold lettering, placed near four panels that told the story of women in Korea during the United States occupation and an assemblage of Korean book and clay pots filled with rice. She used the dress as a metaphor to explore her own history and identity as a Korean-American and the Korean books and clay rice pots allude to Korean Buddhism.

See also 

 Godzilla Asian American Arts Network

References

External links 
 
 Yong Soon Min response to "What is Feminist Art?", 2019, from Archives of American Art, Smithsonian Institution

1953 births
Living people
American people of Korean descent
University of California, Berkeley alumni
University of California, Irvine faculty
American installation artists
South Korean emigrants to the United States
Artists from Los Angeles
American women printmakers
21st-century American women